The Daihatsu Sirion is a subcompact/supermini hatchback produced by the Japanese automobile manufacturer Daihatsu since 1998. The Sirion nameplate was first used on export versions of the Japanese market Storia (between 1998 and 2004) and Boon (between 2004 and 2015). Since 2007, the nameplate has also been used in Indonesia for the Malaysian-built Perodua Myvi, which in its first two generations were redesigned versions of the first and second-generation Boon, while the third generation is a fully independent model developed in-house by Perodua with technical supports from Daihatsu.

International

Indonesia

References

External links 

  (Indonesia)

Sirion
Cars introduced in 1998
2000s cars
2010s cars
2020s cars
Subcompact cars
Hatchbacks
Front-wheel-drive vehicles
All-wheel-drive vehicles
Vehicles with CVT transmission